

Eadwulf (died  837) was a medieval Bishop of Hereford. He was consecrated between 825 and 832 and died between 836 and 839.

Notes

Citations

References

External links
 

Bishops of Hereford
9th-century English bishops
830s deaths
Year of birth unknown